Michelle Jenner Husson (born 14 September 1986) is a Spanish actress. She has starred in several films.

Biography 
Michelle Jenner Husson was born on 14 September 1986 in Barcelona, Spain. She is the daughter of Miguel Ángel Jenner, a Spanish actor of English descent, and Martine Husson, a French actress and music-hall dancer. She has an older brother, David Jenner Husson. She studied theater, singing and dance at the Company & Company School, and studied acting at the Nancy Tuñon acting school.

Career

Acting career 

Jenner started working in television commercials when she was two years old. Her first work in television was in the 2000 television series El cor de la ciutat, in which she played Alícia. She played Natalia in the 2004 film Nubes de verano, directed by Felipe Vega. She worked as Sara Miranda in the comedy television series Los hombres de Paco from 2005 to 2010. The actress also appeared in the 2009 films Íntimos y extraños, directed by [Rubén Alonso, and in the comedy Spanish Movie, directed by Javier Ruiz Caldeira. She starred in two films in 2011, the first being Don't Be Afraid, directed by Montxo Armendaríz, in which she played Silvia, a character who, as a child, was abused by her father. The actress talked to victims of child abuse to study her role. Jenner also starred in the same year in the science fiction comedy film Extraterrestrial, directed by Nacho Vigalondo, in which she plays Julia, a girl who gets involved in a love quadrangle during an alien invasion in Madrid. She plays the lead role, Queen Isabella I of Castille in the 2012 Televisión Española historical drama television series Isabel.

Voice acting career 

Jenner started her voice acting career when she was six years old. Among her works include Hermione Granger in the first four Harry Potter films in Catalan and Spanish, and Giosué in the Italian film Life is Beautiful. She also dubbed the main character of the PlayStation 3 video game Heavy Rain. She voiced Beatrice in the Spanish dub of Cartoon Network miniseries Over the Garden Wall. She dubbed Aloy in Horizon: Zero Dawn (2017) for PS4, and she reprises her role in the DLC Horizon Zero Dawn: The Frozen Wilds.

Personal life 
Since 2013, Michelle Jenner is in a relationship with Javier García González, a dog trainer. In July 2019, she gave birth to the couple's first child, a boy, whom they called Hugo García Jenner.

Filmography

Television series

Television films

Television shows

Film

Short films

Video games

References

External links 

 
 
 Michelle Jenner - Festival de Cannes (fr)
 Portrait de Michelle Jenner (fr)
 Michelle Jenner : eldoblaje.com (es)
 Michelle Jenner : eldoblatge.com  (es)

1986 births
Living people
Actresses from Barcelona
Spanish child actresses
Spanish film actresses
Spanish people of English descent
Spanish people of French descent
Spanish television actresses
Spanish voice actresses
21st-century Spanish actresses